Below is a list of squads used in the 1998 African Cup of Nations.

Group A

Burkina Faso
Coach:  Philippe Troussier

Cameroon
Coach: Jean-Manga Onguene

Algeria
Coach: Abderrahmane Mehdaoui

Guinea
Coach:  Vladimir Muntyan

Group B

Ghana
Coach:  Rinus Israel

Tunisia
Coach:  Henryk Kasperczak

Togo
Coach:  Eberhard Vogel

Congo DR
Coach: Louis Watunda

Group C

South Africa
Coach: Jomo Sono

Angola
Coach:  Professor Neca

Cote d'Ivoire
Coach:  Robert Nouzaret

Namibia
Coach: Ruston Mogane

Group D

Zambia
Coach:  Burkhard Ziese replaced by George Mungwa for last match.

Morocco
Coach:  Henri Michel

Egypt
Coach: Mahmoud El-Gohary

Mozambique
Coach: Arnaldo Salvado

References
 (RSSSF)

Africa Cup of Nations squads
Squads